Abdul Rahman Baba (born 2 July 1994), also known as Baba Rahman, is a Ghanaian professional footballer who plays as a left-back for Reading, on loan from Chelsea, and the Ghana national team.

Beginning his career at Dreams FC, he played in the Ghanaian Premier League with Asante Kotoko. In 2012, he signed for Bundesliga club Greuther Fürth, where he spent two seasons. He then played for FC Augsburg before joining Chelsea in 2015 for a fee of £14 million, potentially rising to £22 million.

Rahman made his international debut in 2014 and was part of their squad which were runners-up at the 2015 Africa Cup of Nations.

Early life 
Abdul Rahman Baba was born on 2 July 1994 in Tamale in the Northern Region of Ghana to Alhaji Baba (Zobognaa) and Hajia Fati Baba Sibdoo. He attended Our Lady Of Fatima JHS and Young Dakpem’yili JHS, all in Tamale. He made his footballing debut with his local team Young Meteors Tamale playing for them from 2004 to 2010, before being scouted and joining Dreams FC, an Accra based club at the age of 16.

Club career

Ghana
Rahman began his career at Dreams FC of the Ghana Division Two. After impressive performances, he was then transferred on loan to Asante Kotoko of the Ghanaian Premier League for one season.

For the 2012 season, Rahman was a finalist for the league's Discovery of the Year Award, eventually losing to Joshua Oninku. After becoming a sought after player during his time with the Kumasi-based club, serious enquiries were made about the player by Manchester City and Arsenal of the Premier League and Parma of Serie A.

Germany

However, Rahman eventually signed with newly promoted Greuther Fürth in the Bundesliga on 12 June 2012. Rahman stated that his decision to join Fürth was because the club offered, "the best conditions in which to develop my career." In the derby against 1. FC Nürnberg on 11 August 2014 he scored his first two goals for Fürth in a 5–1 home victory. The next day he signed with FC Augsburg of the same division.

In Rahman's 2014–15 season with Augsburg, he made 108 tackles, more than any other player in the Bundesliga that season. Using aspects of his strength and pace, he was able to win 90 of those tackles, coming out to an 83% successful tackle rate. That season, Rahman also had 83 interceptions and won 80 contested aerial balls.

Chelsea

2015–16 season

On 16 August 2015, Rahman signed for Chelsea on a five-year deal for an undisclosed fee, reported to be an initial £14 million, rising to a potential fee of almost £22 million. He made his debut on 16 September in a UEFA Champions League tie, playing the full 90 minutes in a 4–0 win at home to Maccabi Tel Aviv. He made his Premier League debut in a 2–0 win over Aston Villa at Stamford Bridge on 17 October. He played at left-back in games including their 2–1 Champions League win over Dynamo Kyiv.

On 27 February, Rahman made an error which allowed Southampton's Shane Long to score in the 42nd minute; he was substituted for Kenedy at half time but Chelsea eventually won 2–1 at St. Mary's.

Schalke 04 (loan)

On 2 August 2016, FC Schalke 04 confirmed that Rahman had moved on a season-long loan to the club after failing to impress the new Chelsea manager Antonio Conte during pre-season. Rahman was given the number 14 jersey for the upcoming season. He was signed by his former Augsburg manager, Markus Weinzierl. Rahman told the local newspaper Ruhr Nachrichten that Conte advised him to leave on loan because he preferred more defensive players than him.

Rahman made his competitive debut for the Gelsenkirchen team on 20 August, as a winger instead of a defender in a 4–1 victory against FC 08 Villingen in the first round of the DFB-Pokal. He made his league debut on 27 August, coming on for Sead Kolašinac in the 62nd minute of an eventual 1–0 loss at Eintracht Frankfurt on the first day of the season. Rahman scored his first goal for Schalke on 15 September, the game's only in a Europa League victory at OGC Nice.

In January 2018, Rahman joined Schalke 04 on loan for a second time agreeing an 18-month stay until summer 2019.

Reims (loan)
In January 2019, he returned early to Chelsea and was immediately loaned to Stade de Reims until the end of the season.

Mallorca (loan) 
On 2 September 2019, the last day of transfer window, Rahman was again loaned out in a season-long deal, this time to newly promoted La Liga side Mallorca.

PAOK (loan) 
On 30 January 2021, Rahman was loaned out to PAOK for the remainder of the 2020–21 season. He made his debut for the Greek side against Lamia on 20 February scoring the first goal in a 4–0 victory to send his side second in the league table.

Reading (loan) 
On 27 August 2021, Rahman joined Reading on loan. He made his debut for the club against Queens Park Rangers on 10 September. On 31 August 2022, Rahman rejoined Reading on another season-long-loan.

International career
Rahman played every minute of Ghana's campaign at the 2015 Africa Cup of Nations in Equatorial Guinea, providing the cross from which André Ayew headed in the winner against South Africa to win Group C. In the final against the Ivory Coast, Rahman scored in the penalty shootout in which his team lost 9–8.  

Baba Rahman was selected for Ghana's final squad at the 2022 FIFA World Cup, and provided an assist during his side's opening match against Portugal; he produced the cross which was headed into goal by Osman Bukari.

Personal life
Rahman has "Baba" on the back of his jersey, the name of his Chelsea-supporting father. In May 2016, Rahman married his longtime childhood girlfriend, Selma, in their hometown of Tamale in northern Ghana. Rahman started doing philanthropic work in his hometown, Tamale whilst playing in Europe. In 2021, he donated football materials and equipment to his former school and to the Tamale Juvenile Unit to help upcoming sportsmen within the northern part of Ghana.

Career statistics

Club

International

Scores and results list Ghana's goal tally first, score column indicates score after each Rahman goal.

Honours
Asante Kotoko F.C.
 Ghana Premier League: 2011–12

PAOK
 Greek Cup: 2020–21
Ghana
Africa Cup of Nations runner-up: 2015

References

External links

1994 births
Living people
People from Tamale, Ghana
Ghanaian footballers
Ghana international footballers
Ghana under-20 international footballers
Association football fullbacks
Ghanaian expatriate footballers
Asante Kotoko S.C. players
SpVgg Greuther Fürth players
FC Augsburg players
Chelsea F.C. players
FC Schalke 04 players
Stade de Reims players
Bundesliga players
2. Bundesliga players
Premier League players
Ligue 1 players
RCD Mallorca players
La Liga players
PAOK FC players
Reading F.C. players
Super League Greece players
2015 Africa Cup of Nations players
2017 Africa Cup of Nations players
2019 Africa Cup of Nations players
2021 Africa Cup of Nations players
2022 FIFA World Cup players
Expatriate footballers in Germany
Expatriate footballers in England
Expatriate footballers in France
Expatriate footballers in Spain
Expatriate footballers in Greece
Ghanaian expatriate sportspeople in Germany
Ghanaian expatriate sportspeople in England
Ghanaian expatriate sportspeople in France
Ghanaian expatriate sportspeople in Spain
Ghanaian expatriate sportspeople in Greece